The Challenge de Curling Desjardins, formerly the Challenge Casino de Charlevoix is an annual bonspiel, or curling tournament, that takes place at the Aréna de Clermont and the Club de Curling Nairn in Clermont, Québec. The tournament is held in a triple-knockout format. The tournament, which was sponsored by Casino de Charlevoix until 2021, has been held every year (except 2020) since its inception in 2003 and was part of the World Curling Tour. This tournament, along with the Challenge Casino Lac Leamy, was one of the few major curling events in Québec. Desjardins Insurance became the title sponsor in 2022.

Past champions

Men
Only skip's name is displayed.

Open
Only skip's name is displayed.

References

External links
Home Page

Capitale-Nationale
Curling in Quebec